is the second single by Japanese heavy metal band X Japan, then named X, released on April 10, 1986.

Background and release

"Orgasm" was the first release by drummer Yoshiki's own record label Extasy Records. All 1,500 copies sold out, and in his biography Yoshiki says an additional pressing of 2,500 copies was scheduled, but was cancelled as guitarist Jun and bassist Hikaru had left the band.

The song is notoriously known for the obvious sexual themes presented within the lyrics. Of particular notice is the fact that the track begins with heavy panting and ends with explosions, seemingly to emulate sexual climax. The title track as well as the self-titled "X" would later be re-recorded for the band's 1989 second album Blue Blood. While Yoshiki is credited with the lyrics and music for both these songs on the single, the Blue Blood recordings credit his alias "Hitomi Shiratori" for their lyrics instead.

Legacy
"X" has become a signature song of X Japan, being performed at nearly all of their concerts. Numerous times during a pause in a performance of the track a band member, usually vocalist Toshi, will yell "We are..." and the audience responds with "X!" before the musicians start the last leg of the song. This was used as the title to the 2016 documentary film about the group, We Are X.

On November 21, 1993, SME Records released , a short film based on the manga series X by Clamp and set to X Japan's music. It features a slideshow of the manga's artwork set to a medley of X Japan's "Silent Jealousy", "Kurenai" and "Endless Rain" and a music video for the song "X" directed by Shigeyuki Hayashi.

Inzargi, vocalist of Megamasso, covered "X" for his 2012 cover album.

Track listing

Personnel

 Toshimitsu "Toshi" Deyama – vocals
 Yoshiki Hayashi – drums
 Hisashi "Jun" Takai – guitar
 Hikaru Utaka – bass guitar
 Engineer – Hiroshi Kuramochi
 Photo – Yuka Momats, Hide Igarashi
Personnel per "Orgasm" liner notes.

References

1986 singles
X Japan songs
Songs written by Yoshiki (musician)
Japanese-language songs